Clapham station may refer to:
In Yorkshire:
Clapham railway station
In London:
Clapham Common railway station (station closed in 1863)
Clapham Common tube station
Clapham High Street railway station
Clapham Junction railway station
Clapham North tube station
Clapham South tube station
In Australia:
Clapham railway station, Adelaide